Pallimon  is a village in Kollam district in the state of Kerala, India.

Demographics
At the 2001 India census, Pallimon had a population of 19,920 (9,721 males and 10,199 females).

Literacy rate of Nedumpana city is 93.20 % lower than state average of 94.00 %. In Nedumpana, Male literacy is around 95.90 % while female literacy rate is 90.76 %.

References

Villages in Kollam district